Chippewa Square is one of the 22 squares of Savannah, Georgia, United States. It is located in the middle row of the city's five rows of squares, on Bull Street and McDonough Street, and was laid out in 1815. It is south of Wright Square, west of Colonial Park Cemetery, north of Madison Square and east of Orleans Square. The oldest building on the square is The Savannah Theatre, at 222 Bull Street, which dates to 1818.

The square named in honor of American soldiers killed in the Battle of Chippawa during the War of 1812. (The spelling "Chippewa" is correct in reference to this square.)

In the center of the square is the James Oglethorpe Monument, created by sculptor Daniel Chester French and architect Henry Bacon and unveiled in 1910. Oglethorpe faces south, toward Georgia's one-time enemy in Spanish Florida, and his sword is drawn. Busts of Confederate figures Francis Stebbins Bartow and Lafayette McLaws were moved from Chippewa Square to Forsyth Park to make room for the Oglethorpe monument. Due to the location of the monument, Savannahians sometimes refer to this as Oglethorpe Square, but that is located just to the northeast.

The "park bench" scene which opens the 1994 film Forrest Gump was filmed on the north side of Chippewa Square.  The bench was a fiberglass prop, rather than one of the park's actual benches. A replica of the prop bench used in the film is on display at the Savannah Visitors Center. The original prop is now kept in Paramount Studios, Los Angeles.

Chippewa Square is also home to the First Baptist Church (1833), the Independent Presbyterian Church and the Philbrick–Eastman House (1847).

Dedication

Markers and structures

Constituent buildings

Each building below is in one of the eight blocks around the square composed of four residential "tything" blocks and four civic ("trust") blocks, now known as the Oglethorpe Plan. They are listed with construction years where known.

Northwestern residential/tything block
Independent Presbyterian Church, 207 Bull Street (1891) – by John Holden Greene; gutted in the 1889 fire, rebuilt 1891
Independent Presbyterian Church School Building, 207 Bull Street (1894) – by Charles Henry
Honora Foley Property, 14 West Hull Street (1896) – by Henry Urban; also known as the Foley House Inn
Julius Perlinski House, 22 West Hull Street (c. 1903)

Northwestern civic/trust block
First Baptist Church, 223 Bull Street (1833)

Southwestern civic/trust block
Philbrick–Eastman House, 17 West McDonough Street (1847)

Southwestern residential/tything block
3 West Perry Street (1831) – former home of Joseph Frederick Waring
John Stoddard House, 15 West Perry Street (1867)
Stoddard Row, 19–25 West Perry Street (1854–55)
233 Bull Street (1842) – originally the home of Moses Eastman, later of the Philbrick–Eastman House 

Northeastern residential/tything block
Board of Education Building, 208 Bull Street (1908–1910)

Northeastern civic/trust block

The Savannah Theatre, 222 Bull Street (1818) – oldest building on the square

Southeastern civic/trust block
Julius Koox Duplex, 230–232 Bull Street (1871)

Southeastern residential/tything block
234 Bull Street (c. 1900)
240 Bull Street (1890)
Hetty, Abbie & Phillipa Minis House, 11 East Perry Street (c. 1820)

Gallery

References

Chippewa Square, Savannah
1815 establishments in Georgia (U.S. state)